Greta Chi (born Chi Ke Ping; Copenhagen, Denmark), is an actress who was active in the 1960s and 1970s in the U.S.

Biography
The daughter of a Chinese diplomat father and a German mother, she had some cachet as an "exotic" starlet in the 1950s and '60s. She appeared in supporting parts in lower-budget U.S. and foreign movies, as well as some television shows. Although she had only one starring role in the movie Lisette (Fall Girl) in 1961 with John Agar, she is best known for her role as Ling-Ling, a Siamese cat transformed into a human by Samantha Stephens in a 1965 episode of Bewitched titled "Ling Ling" (Season 1 episode 21)

Personal life
Chi is currently living in Lucerne, Switzerland, where she has spent most of her life. She married and became known as Greta Maxwell. Her father founded a Chinese restaurant, Li Tai Pe, in Lucerne. After her parents' deaths, she became the owner and manager of the restaurant.

Filmography
Five Gates to Hell (as Yoette; 1959)
Lisette (Fall Girl) (as Lisette; 1961)
 Queen of The Chantecler (as Mata Hari; 1962)
 Coffin from Hong Kong (1964)
Fathom (as KGB Major Jo May Soon; 1967)
Farewell to Manzanar (documentary; 1976)

Television appearances
The Brothers Brannagan (as Tina in "The Key of Jade"; 1960)
Adventures in Paradise (as Tara in "The Beach at Belle Anse"; 1962)
Bewitched (as Ling Ling; 1965)
The Rogues (1965)
Burke's Law (as Kara in "The Prisoners of Mr. Sin"; 1965)
Get Christie Love! ("Deadly Justice"; 1974)
Police Story (as Barbara Chang in "Year of the Dragon: Part 2"; 1975)

References

External links
 
 Profile, fandango.com; accessed 13 November 2014

Danish film actresses
Danish television actresses
Danish people of Chinese descent
Danish people of German descent
Living people
Year of birth missing (living people)
Danish expatriates in Switzerland
Swiss people of Chinese descent
People from Lucerne